Amphimallon atrum is a species of beetle in the Melolonthinae subfamily that can be found in Belgium, Italy, Spain and on the island of Corsica.

References

Beetles described in 1790
atrum
Beetles of Europe